Orka may refer to:
 Orca, killer whale
 Orga, Cyprus, a village in Cyprus
 Orka (comics), a fictional character in comic book  
 Roketsan Orka, Turkish lightweight torpedo